Processes is a monthly peer-reviewed open-access scientific journal covering process/systems related research in chemistry, biology, materials, and allied engineering fields. It was established in 2013 and is published by MDPI. The journal publishes regular research papers, communications, letters, short notes, and reviews. The founding editor-in-chief was Michael A. Henson (University of Massachusetts Amherst), who was succeeded in 2020 by Giancarlo Cravotto (University of Turin).

In September 2021 the journal was among the initial 13 journals included in the official Norwegian list of possibly predatory journals, known as level X.

Abstracting and indexing
The journal is abstracted and indexed in:
Chemical Abstracts Service
Current Contents/Engineering, Computing & Technology
Inspec
Science Citation Index Expanded
Scopus
According to the Journal Citation Reports, the journal has a 2019 impact factor of 2.753.

References

External links

Monthly journals
Creative Commons Attribution-licensed journals
Engineering journals
MDPI academic journals
Publications established in 2013
English-language journals